The 1980–81 IHL season was the 36th season of the International Hockey League, a North American minor professional league. Eight teams participated in the regular season, and the Saginaw Gears won the Turner Cup.

Regular season

Turner Cup Playoffs

Quarterfinals

(E3) Flint Generals vs. (W4) Muskegon Mohawks

(E1) Saginaw Gears vs. (E2) Port Huron Flags

(W2) Fort Wayne Komets vs. (W3) Milwaukee Admirals

Semifinals

(W1) Kalamazoo Wings vs. (E3) Flint Generals

(E1) Saginaw Gears vs. (W2) Fort Wayne Komets

Turner Cup final

(W1) Kalamazoo Wings vs. (E1) Saginaw Gears

External links
 Season 1980/81 on hockeydb.com
 1980-81 IHL Playoff Results on hockeydb.com

IHL
International Hockey League (1945–2001) seasons